Engràcia Pareto Homs (6 May 1889 – 1 September 1973), better known as Graziella Pareto, was a Catalan soprano leggiero, one of the leading sopranos of the inter-war years. She is considered one of the great coloratura sopranos of the "Spanish School" of the early 20th century, alongside Maria Barrientos, Maria Galvany and Mercedes Capsir.

Biography
Pareto was born in Barcelona, Spain. She studied in Milan, and made her stage debut in Barcelona, as Micaela in Carmen in 1906, and in Madrid, in 1908, as Amina in La sonnambula. She made her debut at La Scala, as Gilda from Rigoletto in 1914.

She appeared in Paris, London, Vienna, and St Petersburg, and had a long association with the Teatro Colón in Buenos Aires, where she sang from 1909 until 1927, also appearing with the Chicago Opera Company from 1921 to 1922. Her best
roles included: Rosina, Norina, Lucia, Juliette, Ophélie, Leila, and Lakmé.

She retired to Naples, with her second husband, Dr Nando Arena (they wed on December 1st 1926). She had previously been briefly married to the composer Gabriele Sibella (they wed in August 1911). She died in Rome, Italy on 1 September 1973.

References

External links
 Pareto's discography can be searched at the National Library of Catalonia 
 Album of artistic and family photographs and press clippings by Graziella Pareto. DOI: 10.5281/zenodo.4781432 (Zenodo). 25/05/2021 

1889 births
1973 deaths
Opera singers from Catalonia
Spanish operatic sopranos
Singers from Barcelona
20th-century Spanish women opera singers